Barbie is an upcoming American romantic comedy film directed by Greta Gerwig and written by Gerwig and Noah Baumbach. Based on the Barbie fashion dolls by Mattel from Ruth Handler, the film is the first live-action Barbie film after several computer-animated direct-to-video and streaming television films. The film stars Margot Robbie and Ryan Gosling as Barbie and Ken, with a supporting ensemble cast that includes Will Ferrell, Simu Liu, America Ferrera, Ariana Greenblatt, Ncuti Gatwa, Emma Mackey, Alexandra Shipp, Michael Cera, Issa Rae, Kingsley Ben-Adir, Rhea Perlman and Kate McKinnon.

The film was announced in 2009 by Universal Pictures with Laurence Mark producing, but development began in April 2014, when Sony Pictures acquired its rights. Following multiple writer and director changes and the casting of two different actresses to play the title role, Sony lost the rights and these were subsequently transferred to Warner Bros. Pictures. Robbie was cast in 2019 and serves as a producer (through the LuckyChap Entertainment banner) with production credited alongside Mattel Films and Heyday Films. Gerwig was confirmed as director and co-writer with Baumbach in 2021. Gosling and the rest of the cast were announced in early 2022, and filming began that March in England, wrapping in July.

Barbie is scheduled to be released in the United States on July 21, 2023, by Warner Bros. Pictures.

Premise 
After being expelled from "Barbieland" for being a less-than-perfect doll, Barbie sets off for the human world to find true happiness.

Cast

Additionally, Simu Liu, Kingsley Ben-Adir, Issa Rae, Ncuti Gatwa, and Hari Nef appear as different variations of Barbie and Ken.

Production
Development on a film based on the Barbie toy line began in September 2009, when it was announced that Mattel had signed a partnership to develop the project with Universal Pictures and with Laurence Mark as producer, but nothing came to fruition. In April 2014, Mattel teamed with Sony Pictures to produce the film, which would have Jenny Bicks writing the screenplay and Laurie Macdonald and Walter F. Parkes producing through the Parkes+MacDonald Image Nation banner they created. Filming at the time was anticipated to begin by the end of the year. In March 2015, Diablo Cody was brought onto the project to rewrite the screenplay, and Amy Pascal joined the producing team. Sony would again have rewrites done to the screenplay later that year, hiring Lindsey Beer, Bert V. Royal and Hillary Winston to write drafts.

In December 2016, Amy Schumer entered negotiations to star in the title role, with the Winston screenplay being used that would be rewritten by Schumer and by Schumer’s sister, Kim Caramele. In March 2017, due to scheduling conflicts with the planned June 2017 filming start, Schumer exited negotiations. That July, Anne Hathaway began circling the title role, with Sony hiring Olivia Milch to rewrite the screenplay and approaching Alethea Jones to direct as a means to interest Hathaway into signing on. Jones was attached to direct by March 2018. However, the expiration of Sony's option on the project in October 2018 and its transfer to Warner Bros. Pictures would see the departures of Hathaway, Jones, Macdonald, Parkes and Pascal. Margot Robbie would enter early talks for the role, with Patty Jenkins briefly circling the director position. Robbie's casting was confirmed in July 2019, with Greta Gerwig and Noah Baumbach now penning the screenplay. Gerwig would sign on to also direct the film in July 2021. Robbie stated that the film's aim is to subvert expectations and give audiences "the thing you didn't know you wanted." Helen Mirren narrated the film's trailer and also filmed a brief cameo for the film.

In October, Ryan Gosling entered final negotiations to play Ken in the film. Gosling and the rest of the cast were confirmed to star in the first half of 2022. Principal photography began in March 2022 at Warner Bros. Studios, Leavesden in England and wrapped on July 21, 2022. Rodrigo Prieto serves as cinematographer, while Jacqueline Durran, who previously collaborated with Gerwig on Little Women (2019), serves as costume designer for the film.

Music 
Alexandre Desplat was confirmed to be scoring the film in early September 2022, who previously worked with Gerwig on Little Women (2019).

Despite fan expectations for the 1997 song "Barbie Girl" by pop band Aqua to appear in the film, Ulrich Møller-Jørgensen, manager for Aqua lead singer Lene Nystrøm, said that it would not be used. Variety speculated that this was due to poor relations between Mattel and MCA Records, the song's American publisher, who were engaged in a series of lawsuits over the song from 1997 to 2002.

Release
Barbie is scheduled to be theatrically released in the United States on July 21, 2023, taking over the original release date of Coyote vs. Acme. It was previously set for: June 2, 2017; May 12, 2017; June 29, 2018; August 8, 2018; and May 8, 2020.

Marketing 
A first-look photo for Barbie was revealed at Warner Bros. presentation at CinemaCon 2022 on April 27, 2022. The photo saw Robbie as Barbie, sitting behind the wheel of her iconic pink 1965 Chevrolet Corvette. Another photo, featuring Gosling as Ken, was released on June 25, 2022. More than a year before the release of the film, several internet memes involving promotional shots of the characters, memetic references centered on purchasing tickets to the film, and comparisons with its box-office competition Oppenheimer began to spread on social media platforms like Twitter and TikTok.

A teaser trailer first debuted during Thursday night screenings of Avatar: The Way of Water. It featured a parody of the opening sequence in Stanley Kubrick's 1968 science fiction film 2001: A Space Odyssey, narrated by Helen Mirren. The trailer, alongside a poster, was released to the public the following day on December 16, 2022. Christopher McPherson of Collider called it an "absolutely genius marketing ploy". Russ Milheim of the Direct described it as "wildly vibrant" and compared it to The Lego Movie (2014) in its meta-reference and embracing the outlandish.

Reception

"Barbiecore" trend
Barbie's aesthetics made a noticeable cultural impact in the summer of 2022, more than a year before the film's scheduled release, as a result of the release of early stills of Robbie as Barbie as well as bystander photos from the film's location shooting that highlighted the use of bright pastel colors in two options: first, pink had previously been projected by many publications as a fashion trend for the coming year; and second, the popularity was seen as having been boosted by discussion of the film, leading to its being dubbed "Barbiecore".

Though primarily discussed as a clothing trend, it also encompassed interior design and makeup. Vogue remarked that "the filming of Greta Gerwig's forthcoming movie has made Barbiecore—which mostly translates into skimpy looks in bright pink—the trend of this summer." The New York Times also predicts a 2023 fashion trend composed of "neon pink and yellow, with the related postmodern revisionism of the classic fashion palette."

References

External links
 

2023 films
2023 romantic comedy films
2020s romantic comedy films
2020s children's films
2020s children's comedy films
American romantic comedy films
American children's comedy films
Film and television memes
Films about Barbie
Films based on toys
Films directed by Greta Gerwig
Films scored by Alexandre Desplat
Films shot at Warner Bros. Studios, Leavesden
Films shot in the United Kingdom
Internet memes
Internet memes introduced in 2022
Warner Bros. films
Upcoming English-language films
2020s English-language films
2020s American films